Alan S. Thompson (born 1954) is a Vice Admiral in the United States Navy. He retired from the U.S. Navy in November 2011 as the Director of the Defense Logistics Agency.  He was in this position since November 2008.

Thompson's previous assignments included duty as Commander of the Defense Supply Center in Columbus, Ohio. Director of the Defense Logistics Agency and Commander of the Naval Supply Systems Command. In addition he also served as Chief of Supply Corps.

He has served as the chief executive officer of HomeSafe Alliance since September 2019.

Education
 Bachelor of Arts degree in economics, University of California, Los Angeles, Los Angeles, California.
 Master of Business Administration degree, University of Florida, Gainesville, Florida.
 Senior Executive Program, Columbia University, New York city

References

External links

Official Profile

1954 births
Living people
University of California, Los Angeles alumni
Warrington College of Business alumni
Columbia Business School alumni
United States Navy admirals
Recipients of the Meritorious Service Medal (United States)
Recipients of the Legion of Merit
Recipients of the Defense Superior Service Medal